Events during the year 1935 in  Northern Ireland.

Incumbents
 Governor - 	 The Duke of Abercorn 
 Prime Minister - James Craig

Events
1 April – The National Athletics and Cycling Association is suspended from the International Amateur Athletic Federation for refusing to confine its activities to the Free State side of the border.
18 June – Ministry of Home Affairs bans all parades from this date, but lifts it for 12 July parades.
12 July – Rioting breaks out in Belfast following Orange Order parades. By 21 July nine people have been shot dead and scores injured. Rioting continues to the end of August, by which time eight Protestants and five Catholics have been killed, hundreds injured and over 2,000 homes destroyed (almost all Catholic).
26 October – Lord Edward Carson, the Dublin-born unionist leader and barrister, is buried in St Anne's Cathedral, Belfast.
14 November – United Kingdom general election.

Arts and literature
September – Louis MacNeice publishes his Poems.
7 December – The Strand Cinema is opened in Belfast.

Sport

Football
Irish League
Winners: Linfield

Irish Cup
Winners: Glentoran 1 - 0 Larne

Golf
British Ladies Amateur Golf Championship is held at Royal County Down Golf Club, (winner: Wanda Morgan).

Births
3 February – Alexander McDonnell, 9th Earl of Antrim.
29 March – Ruby Murray, singer (died 1996).
9 May – Rev. John Coey Smyth, Former President of Elim Pentecostal Church (died 2020)
21 April – Robin Dixon, 3rd Baron Glentoran, former bobsledder and politician.
11 July – Oliver Napier, first leader of the Alliance Party.
27 July – Billy McCullough, former international soccer player.
30 September – James McKendry, artist.
3 October – Jimmy Hill, soccer player and manager.
9 October – Billy Bell, Ulster Unionist Party former Lord Mayor of Belfast and also of Lisburn.
21 October – Derek Bell, harpist and composer (died 2002).

Full date unknown
Mary Nelis - Sinn Féin MLA.

Deaths
17 July – George William Russell, critic, poet and artist (born 1867).
22 July – William Mulholland, water service engineer in Southern California (born 1855).
9 August – James Buchanan, 1st Baron Woolavington, businessman and philanthropist (born 1849).
23 August – Charles Rafter, Chief Constable of Birmingham City Police from 1899 to 1935 (b. c1860).
22 October – Edward Carson, Irish Unionist leader, barrister and judge (born 1854).

See also
1935 in Scotland
1935 in Wales

References